St. Mark United Presbyterian Church is a historic church at 225 Main Street in Elbert, Colorado.  It was built in 1889 and was added to the National Register of Historic Places in 1980. It is currently the only National Register listing in Elbert County, Colorado.

It is a one-and-a-half-story building with a high gable roof.  It has a church tower with a four-sided cupola.  Its donated land is on a hillside, and the church is approached by a staircase.

References

Buildings and structures in Elbert County, Colorado
Presbyterian churches in Colorado
Churches on the National Register of Historic Places in Colorado
Churches completed in 1880